Chapadinha is a Brazilian municipality in the state of Maranhão. It is located 235 km south-east of the state capital São Luís. The population is 80,195 (2020) and the total area is 3,247 km2.

The municipality lies in the Munim River basin.
The municipality contains the  Chapada Limpa Extractive Reserve, created in 2007.

References

Municipalities in Maranhão